Wiener Blut may refer to:

Wiener Blut (waltz), a waltz by Johann Strauss II
Wiener Blut (operetta), an operetta by Johann Strauss II
Wiener Blut (album), an album by Falco
"Wiener Blut" (song), the title song from the album
 Vienna Blood, a 1942 film by Willi Forst
A 1997 album and song by the Austrian metal band Stahlhammer
Wiener Blut, a song from Liebe Ist Für Alle Da, album by the German band Rammstein